Classical acting is a traditional type of acting centered around the external behavior of the performer. It may be contrasted with newer styles of acting, developed around the ideas of Konstantin Stanislavski, which place emphasis on an actor's psychological relationship with their part.

Education
Classical acting today is available for study in universities, drama conservatories, and acting studios across the world. Schools that are attached to or affiliated with a professional classical theatre company give students exposure and opportunity beyond simply the education. Examples of schools or studios with classical acting programs include:

 University of London's Drama Conservatoire: This Masters of Acting program draws on theories of Michel Saint-Denis with training of the body, voice, and imagination. There is an emphasis on re-interpretation and re-imagining, with equal parts of art and craft in the education. Classical texts of Greek tragedy and Shakespeare are utilized, as well as modern plays.
 CNSAD The Conservatoire national supérieur d'art dramatique (English: French National Academy of Dramatic Arts): France's national drama academy located in Paris. It is a higher education institution run by the French Ministry of Culture and, with an acceptance rate of two to three percent and an average graduating class of thirty students, widely considered the most selective acting conservatory in France, is consistently regarded as a top world-class performing arts institute renowned for its excellence in theatre education.
 The Juilliard School Drama Division in New York: The School has both a B.F.A. and M.F.A. program that emphasizes intuition and spontaneity, as well as discipline, technique, and intellectual development. There is both vocal and physical training, with script and word analysis, style work, and risk taking with imagination.
 Montreal's National Theatre School of Canada: This three-year conservatory training program focuses on learning the craft and art of acting through the contemporary theatre, applying techniques of voice, singing, and movement. The School ascribes to the philosophies of Michel Saint-Denis, which includes exploration, writing, studio presentations, imagination, improvisation, "the mask", and audition preparation.
 The Berg Studios in Los Angeles: The Studios offer a series of classes at various levels to explore classical acting technique and imagination, including developing of a repeatable acting system, script analysis, physical movement, self-discovery through imagination, and illuminating the dialogue through subtext.
 Andrew Wood Acting Studio in Los Angeles: Andrew Wood Acting Studio offers classes in which students learn an approach to acting taught at the Yale School of Drama. The approach emphasizes visceral activation of the actor through deep examination of circumstances and personalization.
 Yale School of Drama in New Haven, Connecticut: In its M.F.A. program, a strong imagination is encouraged and developed, along with physical and vocal work. Actors are also given extensive production work opportunities, working with director, dramaturgs, and playwrights to create theatre pieces and learn from the collaborative process. Using the body as a source of inspiration and expression of work is a focus of the first year training. Later, text analysis, voice, and speech work are integrated.
 The Bristol Old Vic Theatre School in Bristol, United Kingdom: Opened in 1946 by Laurence Olivier, this South West England school offers a highly selective B.A. Honors of Professional Acting conservatory program. The first year focuses on voice and body, moving onto public productions, and then to preparation for a professional career. The school also provides short courses for the general public who has had some experience or training in acting and wants to broaden skills; the classical acting classes include learning opportunities in voice, movement, verse speaking, improvisation, and stagecraft.
 London Academy of Performing Arts (LAPA), was a boutique Classical acting school, until its closure in 2005.
 Italia Conti Academy of Theatre Arts was founded in 1911 by actress Italia Conti, their drama school course offers a BA (Hons) in Acting. Their stage school, called the Theatre Arts School offers training in classical acting, including Shakespeare

Classically trained actors
Many world-renowned actors and actresses are students of Classical Acting, including Laurence Olivier, Vivien Leigh, Dame Maggie Smith and Ralph Fiennes and Oscar winners Daniel Day-Lewis, Eddie Redmayne, and Cate Blanchett.

Some well-known classically trained actors include:

Peggy Ashcroft
Richard Attenborough
Ethel Barrymore
John Barrymore
Lionel Barrymore
Angela Bassett
Alan Bates
Cate Blanchett
Dirk Bogarde
Kenneth Branagh
Ben Browder
Richard Burton
James Cagney
Gwendoline Christie
Frances Conroy
Tom Courtenay
Benedict Cumberbatch
Timothy Dalton
Bette Davis
Daniel Day-Lewis
Judi Dench
Robert Donat
James Drury
John Dunsworth
Chiwetel Ejiofor
Edith Evans
Joseph Fiennes
Ralph Fiennes
Albert Finney
Kate Fleetwood
John Gielgud
Alec Guinness
Richard Harris
Rex Harrison
Katharine Hepburn
Tom Hiddleston
Ian Holm
Anthony Hopkins
John Hurt
Jeremy Irons
Derek Jacobi
Felicity Jones
Dame Celia Johnson
Boris Karloff
Ben Kingsley
Elsa Lanchester
Angela Lansbury
Charles Laughton
Vivien Leigh
John Lithgow
Richard Madden
James Mason
James McAvoy
Audra McDonald
Ian McKellen
Helen Mirren
Eve Myles
Laurence Olivier
David Oyelowo
Christopher Plummer
Pete Postlethwaite
Sreejith Ramanan
Basil Rathbone
Corin Redgrave
Lynn Redgrave
Michael Redgrave
Vanessa Redgrave
Eddie Redmayne
Ralph Richardson
Alan Rickman
Geoffrey Rush
Margaret Rutherford
Mark Rylance
Alastair Sim
Paul Scofield
William Shatner
Dame Maggie Smith
Timothy Spall
Patrick Stewart
David Tennant
Emma Thompson
Sybil Thorndike
Luke Treadaway
Peter O'Toole
Polly Walker
David Warner
Orson Welles
May Whitty

See also
 List of acting techniques
 Stanislavski's system
 Method acting
 Konstantin Stanislavski
 Lee Strasberg
 Sanford Meisner
 Ion Cojar
 Ivana Chubbuck

References

Acting techniques
Theatre